Nea Ionia (meaning New Ionia) is a city and a former municipality in Magnesia, Thessaly, Greece. Since the 2011 local government reform it is part of the municipality Volos, of which it is a municipal unit. It borders the city of Volos. The population at the 2011 census was 33,815 inhabitants. Its land area is 63.314 km². The name "New Ionia" refers to refugees from western Anatolia that settled in the area after the Greco-Turkish War (1919-1922).

Sporting Teams
Niki Volos F.C.

Sites of interest
Panthessaliko Stadium, Athens 2004 venue
Museum of Greek Resistance, Christou Louli str. 33A

References

External links
Official website 
Official website 
The founding of Nea Ionia, by  Achilleas Adamantiades, PhD
CERETETH, Center of Technology Thessaly

Populated places in Magnesia (regional unit)